Sanjay Claude Ayre (born 19 June 1980 in Kingston, Jamaica) is a retired world-class Jamaican sprinter who specialized in the 400 meters. Ayre won a silver medal at the 2000 Summer Olympic Games. Ayre is a 2004 IAAF World Indoor Championship Gold medalist and a three-time World Outdoor Championship medalist.

During an international athletic career that spanned 15 years, Ayre has won eleven gold, three silver, and four bronze medals at both the junior and senior levels. Ayre graduated from Auburn University after receiving a full athletic scholarship. Ayre would compete internationally throughout his high school and collegiate career, successfully balancing competing priorities. He went on to earn a Bachelor of Arts Degree in Criminology from Auburn University, and in 2003 signed a lucrative shoe contract with sports apparel company Puma.

Early career
Ayre attended Calabar and Excelsior High Schools in St. Andrew, Jamaica where he was an all-around athlete. After moving to the United States, Ayre attended DeWitt Clinton High School in the Bronx, New York, where he participated in multiple sports. In addition to his track & field accomplishments, Ayre was recognized for his outstanding athletic ability in soccer and swimming. Under the coaching of Edward Hector, he was voted the "1999 High School Athlete of the Year" after winning the 400-meter title at the Indoor and Outdoor National Scholastic meets. At the age of 18, still considered a Junior athlete(U20), Ayre made his senior debut representing the Jamaica National team in the 4 × 400 meters relay at the 1999 World Indoor Championships in Maebashi, Japan. This team went on to break the Jamaican National Record. Ayre has also won gold medals at the 1999 Junior Pan American Games and has maintained his prominence as the only Jamaican junior athlete to win the 400-meter and 4 x 400-meter relay titles.

While enrolled at Auburn University, Ayre quickly established himself as a collegiate sprint talent under the guidance of Ralph Spry, who also coached Auburn alumnus and-400 meter World Champion Avard Moncur. As a freshman, Ayre won the 2000 SEC 400-meter Indoor title and went on to receive the NCAA Freshman of the year honors. Also in 2000, Ayre and the Jamaican 4 x 400-meter team would win the silver medal at the Olympic Games in Sydney, Australia. Somewhat hampered by injuries throughout his second year, Ayre regained form late in the summer of 2001 and competed for the Jamaican World Championship team in the 400-meter and 4 × 400 meters relay events. As a junior, he continued his stellar collegiate career receiving multiple All-American honors and went on to compete in the 400-meter and 4 × 400 meters relay events at the 2002 Commonwealth Games in Manchester, England. In his final season as a collegiate athlete, Ayre finished as the NCAA 400-meter indoor runner-up and received a record 14 All-American collegiate honors while competing for the Auburn Tigers.

After an outstanding collegiate career, Ayre began his professional career by remaining at Auburn under the coaching guidance of Ralph Spry until 2005. Following a successful 2005 season, Ayre moved on to be coached by world-renowned 400-meter coaches, Clyde Hart and Michael Ford.

Professional career
Ayre commenced his professional career while still considered a collegiate athlete. However, his first appearance as a professional athlete was at the 2003 Pan American Games in Santo Domingo, DR where he earned a gold medal in the 4 × 400-meters relay. In 2004, Ayre competed at the World Indoor Games where he earned another gold medal in the 4 × 400-meters relay. For Ayre, success continued throughout 2005 as he maintained a top-ten world ranking in the 400-meters contest. Ayre and the Jamaican Men's  relay squad are the only Jamaican Team in history to defeat the U.S Men's  team on U.S soil at the 2005 USA versus The World Penn Relays, Philadelphia, Pennsylvania. After a disappointing 2006 season, Ayre rallied back to win a gold medal at the Central American & Caribbean Games in the 4 × 400-meters relay.

In 2007, Ayre filled the summer with dominating 400-meter performances culminating with the 2007 Jamaican National Championships where on 24 June 2007, he would win the 400-meter title in 45.07s and go on to compete in the 400-meter and 4 × 400-meter relay at the 2007 World Championships in Osaka, Japan where he ultimately finished the season with another top-ten world-ranking.

In 2008, Ayre was a member of the Jamaican Olympic team, led by Usain Bolt, that recorded dominating performances in the sprint events at the 2008 Summer Olympic Games in Beijing, China. While there, Ayre competed in the 400-meter and 4 × 400-meters relay events. Ayre, along with teammates Michael Blackwood, Ricardo Chambers, and Lansford Spence, finished a disappointing eighth place after being favored to win a medal. Ayre won silver medals for Jamaica at the Sydney Olympic Games and Helsinki World Championships.

After athletics
Since retiring from professional competition, Ayre is currently a prolific entrepreneur who devotes his time to coaching Professional & Amateur athlete's, community organizations, Athletics meeting promoter and other professional endeavors. Ayre is currently a professional track coach for Puma. He is also the Director of Athlete Branding with Active Dreamers LLC, a sports apparel company that specializes in marketing NBA licensed products featuring world-renowned athletes such as LeBron James, Stephen "Steph" Curry and Neymar Jr.

In September 2012, after missing out on a 4th Olympic Games, Ayre introduced Maximum Velocity Performance (MVP) Fitness to his local community in Howard County, Maryland. Maximum Velocity Performance is a fitness organization that provides a broad range of sports and physical fitness services. MVP Fitness offers a variety of programs including sports performance coaching, personal training, speed & agility camps, Corporate Wellness Programs, and group fitness classes.

Ayre is active in the local community and is an honorary coach to the Reservoir High School Track Team and Field Team, where he is known as ‘Coach Sanjay’.

Coaching
Ayre has also established himself as a professional track & field coach. He founded Chase Athletics Track Club in 2013, a USATF sanctioned track & field organization. In 2018, Chase athletes competed in Ocean Breeze Grand Prix in Staten Island, NY. The group had the top two finishes in the men's and women's 300m events. Ayre has also made an impact at the collegiate level by coaching athletes at Howard Community College. He was the men's & women's assistant track & field coach and was responsible for coaching the sprint and hurdle events. In 2013, Ayre led Howard Community College's men's track and field team to its first ever National Title in all of the school's sports history. Ayre is a Certified Personal Trainer through the National Academy of Sports Medicine (NASM), USATF Level 1 & 2, IAAF Certified Track & Field Coach, and Global Sports Ambassador for Puma. Ayre has trained Rovane Williams, Andre Clarke, and the Jamaican team at the 2016 Armory Track & Field Invitational.

Community involvement
Ayre is very active in his community and is dedicated to using his platform to amplify organizations that align with his philanthropic goals. One such organization, Chesapeake Urology, sponsors and hosts the annual ZERO Prostate Cancer Run (ZPCC) in Baltimore, MD. Ayre was the co-host for this event in both 2016 and 2017. In 2016, Ayre was instrumental in helping ZERO to raise over $500,000 to combat prostate cancer. Ayre returned in 2017 to co-host the 11th Annual ZERO Prostate Cancer Challenge where the organization set a goal to raise $550,000.
Ayre is active in the local community and is an honorary coach to the Reservoir High School Track and Field Team, where he is known as ‘Coach Sanjay’.

Personal bests

International competition

National competition

References

External links

Olympedia
Baltimore Sun
Olympic Games Athlete Page
Athletic Net
Jamaica Athletics Administrative Association
Auburn University XC/Track
Mile Split USA
Chekpoint (YouTube)
Olympian Database

1980 births
Living people
Auburn Tigers men's track and field athletes
DeWitt Clinton High School alumni
Jamaican male sprinters
Olympic athletes of Jamaica
Athletes (track and field) at the 2000 Summer Olympics
Athletes (track and field) at the 2008 Summer Olympics
Olympic silver medalists for Jamaica
Sportspeople from Kingston, Jamaica
World Athletics Championships medalists
Medalists at the 2000 Summer Olympics
Pan American Games gold medalists for Jamaica
Olympic silver medalists in athletics (track and field)
Pan American Games medalists in athletics (track and field)
Central American and Caribbean Games gold medalists for Jamaica
Athletes (track and field) at the 2003 Pan American Games
Competitors at the 2006 Central American and Caribbean Games
World Athletics Indoor Championships winners
Central American and Caribbean Games medalists in athletics
Medalists at the 2003 Pan American Games
Track and field athletes from New York City